The Malawi Police Service is an independent organ of the executive that is mandated by the constitution to protect public safety and the rights of persons in Malawi. The Malawi Police Service is overseen by an Inspector General of Police.

Police Ranks
 Inspector General
 Deputy Inspector General
 Commissioner
 Deputy Commissioner
 Senior Assistant Commissioner
 Assistant Commissioner
 Senior Superintendent
 Superintendent
 Assistant Superintendent
 Inspector
 Sub Inspector
 Sergeant
 Constable

Inspector General
The Inspector General is the head of the Malawi Police Service. The position is appointed by the President of Malawi and confirmed by the National Assembly. The Public Appointments Committee may at any time inquire as to the competence of the person.  The Inspector General of Police can only serve for five years in that position. The Inspector General of Police can be removed by the president for being incompetent, incapacitated, compromised, or reaching retirement age.
The Inspector General oversees the Malawi Police Service (MPS) under Ministry of Internal Affairs and Public Security. The Inspector General is assisted by a Deputy and two commissioners who run the administration and operations respectively. The current Inspector General is remembered for strengthening MPS by establishing two new policing regions, that is, Central East and South East

Inspector generals:

Societal Impact
During the Hastings Banda regime the police were involved in suppressing dissent. After the 8 March 1992 pastoral letter:
There were public demonstrations in support of the bishops - notably at the University in Blantyre and Zomba, where soldiers indicated their support for the students and deterred violent police action against the protesters. This was the first sign of the army's future political role. In May 1992 student protesters were joined by striking workers in Blantyre. In two days of riots dozens of protesters were killed by armed police and Young Pioneers.

The capabilities of the Malawi Police Service are growing, but its abilities to deter and investigate crimes, assist victims, and apprehend criminals are extremely limited. The police lack basic equipment (particularly transportation), are poorly funded, and do not receive sufficient training. Public support for the police has continued to drop, due in part to alleged corruption and ineffectiveness in deterring criminal activity.

References

External links
 Malawi Police Service Website
 Malawi Constitution - Inspector General of Malawi Police Service
 Interpol - Malawi

Law enforcement in Malawi
Government of Malawi